The Bodyguard is a 1992 American romantic thriller film directed by Mick Jackson. It starred Kevin Costner, Whitney Houston, Gary Kemp, Bill Cobbs and Ralph Waite. The film follows a former United States Secret Service agent turned bodyguard who is hired to protect a famous actress and singer from an unknown stalker.

Academy Awards

All Def Movie Awards

American Black Achievement Awards

American Music Awards
Houston's eight wins tied her with Michael Jackson for the most AMAs ever won in a single year. At that time, she also tied Kenny Rogers on the all-time list with 19 total AMAs. She won her fourth "Favorite Pop/Rock Female Artist" award and tied with Olivia Newton-John for the most AMAs won in this category.

ASCAP Pop Awards

Billboard Music Awards
Houston is the co-holder of the record for the most Billboard Music Awards (11 awards) won in a single year since the award show has been held in 1990 - the awards with ★ marks were honored to her on the show and without ★ marks were not, but her extra #1-ranked-categories on Billboard year-end charts. She became the only artist to grab the top spots of Top Billboard 200 Album, Top R&B Album, Hot 100 Single and Hot R&B Single simultaneously in the history of the charts. She is the only artist to win Top R&B Album three times in the history of Billboard Year-End Charts to date, after Whitney Houston in 1986 and I'm Your Baby Tonight in 1991. In addition, Houston is the second artist behind Elton John and the only female artist to have two number-one Top Billboard 200 Album awards (formerly "Top Pop Album") on Billboard magazine year-end charts.

BRAVO Magazine's Bravo Otto Awards
The BRAVO Otto Awards were determined by the readers' poll on BRAVO, the largest teen magazine within the German-language sphere. The 1993's poll began from the issue #45 (November 4) in 1993 and the results were released in the issue No. 1 (January 6) in 1994.

BMI Film & Television Awards

Brit Awards

Golden Raspberry Awards

Grammy Awards
Houston won her third "Best Pop Vocal Performance, Female" award, which is the second record behind Ella Fitzgerald and Barbra Streisand; each received the award five times.

Japan Academy Film Prize

Japan Gold Disc Awards

Juno Awards

MTV Movie Awards

NAACP Image Awards

The NARM Best Seller Awards

NABOB Communications Awards
Houston was the recipient of an Entertainer of the Year award from the National Association of Black Owned Broadcasters (NABOB) in 1994.

People's Choice Awards
Houston won her fourth "Favorite Female Musical Performer" award. She didn't attend the show due of being nine months pregnant. Instead, she was given two awards at her home by her mother, Cissy Houston, and made an acceptance speech.

Smash Hits Magazine's Smash Hits Poll Winners Party
The Smash Hits Poll Winners Party was an awards ceremony which ran from 1988 to 2005. Each award winner was voted by readers of the Smash Hits magazine.

Soul Train Music Awards
At the 8th Soul Train Music Awards, Houston received Sammy Davis, Jr. Award for her outstanding achievements in the field of entertainment during 1993.

World Music Awards
Houston holds the record for the most World Music Awards (five) won in a single year (tied with Michael Jackson).

Yoga Awards

Notes

References

External links
 

Bodyguard